Krishan Sanjula (born 30 September 1998) is a Sri Lankan cricketer. He made his first-class debut for Sinhalese Sports Club in the 2016–17 Premier League Tournament on 14 February 2017. In December 2017, he was named in Sri Lanka's squad for the 2018 Under-19 Cricket World Cup. He made his Twenty20 debut for Sinhalese Sports Club in the 2018–19 SLC Twenty20 Tournament on 18 February 2019. He made his List A debut for Sinhalese Sports Club in the 2018–19 Premier Limited Overs Tournament on 12 March 2019.

In August 2021, he was named in the SLC Greens team for the 2021 SLC Invitational T20 League tournament. In November 2021, he was selected to play for the Jaffna Kings following the players' draft for the 2021 Lanka Premier League.

References

External links
 

1998 births
Living people
Sri Lankan cricketers
Sinhalese Sports Club cricketers
Place of birth missing (living people)